May Luna (born May 3, 1998) is a Filipino volleyball athlete. She played with the De La Salle University collegiate women's varsity volleyball in the Season 78 of the University Athletic Association of the Philippines. She has also played in the Philippine Volleyball Federation National Inter-Collegiate Volleyball Tournament (InterCol), Philippine National Games, Philippine University Games, Palarong Pambansa and Shakey's G-League.

Personal life
May Luna, also known as "Mayang" was born in Tagum City, Philippines. She is the youngest of 7 siblings. Even before moving to Manila, Luna has already earned an amount of popularity back in her hometown Davao. She studies a Bachelor of Arts in Sports Studies (AB-SPM) at De La Salle University.

Career
Luna was considered one of the most hotly recruited volleyball athletes in the country in 2015. In order to get the commitment of this young Davaoeña, it took a coach such that of DLSU's Ramil de Jesus to personally travel to Davao to recruit this promising athlete. Since then, she was tagged as the ‘heir apparent’ to MVP and former Team Captain Ara Galang, who was on her final year in UAAP.

She won the 2nd Best Outside Spiker of the Shakey's G-League in 2015. In her rookie year, Luna was selected to play for La Salle in the UAAP Season 78.

References

1998 births
Living people
Filipino women's volleyball players
Wing spikers
University Athletic Association of the Philippines volleyball players
De La Salle University alumni
People from Davao del Norte
21st-century Filipino women